Cecily Joan Tynan (born March 19, 1969) is an American television meteorologist who has been with WPVI-TV since 1995. , she is the 5, 6, and 11 pm weathercaster and chief meteorologist at WPVI. She formerly hosted the Saturday evening public affairs program Primetime Weekend.

Education
Tynan is a 1991 graduate of Washington and Lee University, from where she earned a degree with majors in journalism and politics. She holds American Meteorological Society television seal number 1099.

Career
She came to WPVI from KTNV in Las Vegas, Nevada, where she worked as a weather and news anchor for "Good Morning Las Vegas." Prior to that, she was the weekend weather anchor and a general assignment reporter for WDBJ in Roanoke, Virginia.

At WPVI, she started out as a weekend weathercaster and general reporter. She later became the weekday morning weathercaster. When Dave Roberts cut back his duties in 2003, she became the weathercaster for weeknights at 5:30 and 11 p.m. After Lisa Thomas-Laury went on medical leave, Tynan took over as co-host of several locally produced specials, including the 6abc Dunkin' Donuts Thanksgiving Day Parade, the 4th of July Parade, Philly on Wheels, and the Philadelphia Flower Show. In 2009, after Dave Roberts retired, she replaced him on the 5 p.m. and 6 p.m. weathercasts while maintaining her role as the 11pm meteorologist.

Personal life
After she and her first husband school teacher Michael Badger divorced, she married Greg Watson. The couple have two children. As of February 2023, her daughter Emma is 15 yrs old and her son Luke is 17.

Tynan is a triathlete and has run marathons. She was featured on the February 2001 cover of Runner's World magazine. The Broadcast Pioneers of Philadelphia inducted Tynan into their Hall of Fame in 2012.

References

External links
 

1969 births
Living people
Philadelphia television reporters
Television anchors from Philadelphia
Washington and Lee University alumni
People from Newtown, Connecticut